The MV Solo was a Greenpeace ship from 1990 to 1995, originally built in 1977 as an ocean tug called the Smit Houston. Greenpeace updated the ship with a helipad as well as veterinary and laboratory facilities. In 1995 she was chartered by a company working with the Dutch Ministry of Transport, Public Works and Water Management for use as a salvage vessel. At this time the ship was renamed as the ETV Waker. On 7 September 2009, a fire starting in the engine room so seriously damaged the vessel that she was scrapped.

References

External links
Archive.greenpeace.org
Members.chello.nl
Fire-rescue.nl

Ships built in the Netherlands
Ships of the Netherlands
1977 ships
Ships of Greenpeace